Telesistema is a television station in Tegucigalpa, Honduras, broadcasting on Channel 3 and Channel 7 in NTSC and is owned by TVC. The station has repeaters in La Ceiba and Puerto Cortés, also on channel 7. This channel has programs of news, entertainment, series, sports and movies. At night the channel has series and movies. Recently its image and programming were changed, changing its name to TSi (Telesistema Informativo).

Television in Honduras
Mass media in Tegucigalpa